Bury North is a borough constituency in Greater Manchester, created in 1983 and represented in the House of Commons of the UK Parliament. With a Conservative majority of 105 votes, it is the most marginal constituency for a sitting MP in the United Kingdom as of the 2019 general election.

History
Summary of results
Bury North is a marginal seat between Labour and the Conservatives, and a bellwether constituency throughout most of its existence — the winner of the seat has tended to win the general election, with 2017 being an exceptional Labour gain, though it was subsequently regained by the Conservatives in 2019. In forerunner seats, the town of Bury did not have a Labour MP until 1964, since when Bury North has become reported on as an important marginal seat.

The 2010 Conservative win at Bury North was the Conservative Party's sole gain in Greater Manchester. The 2015 general election result was narrower, which produced the fifth-most marginal majority of the Conservative Party's 331 seats by percentage of majority. The 2019 general election result made this the most marginal constituency in Great Britain, with a narrow majority of 105 votes. Only Sinn Fein's majority of 57 in Fermanagh and South Tyrone was lower in the UK, and as Sinn Fein members do not take their seats, Daly's majority is therefore the smallest for that of a sitting MP.

Boundaries 

1983–2010: The Metropolitan Borough of Bury wards of Church, East, Elton, Moorside, Ramsbottom, Redvales, Tottington, and Unsworth.

2010–present: The Metropolitan Borough of Bury wards of Church, East, Elton, Moorside, North Manor, Ramsbottom, Redvales, and Tottington.

The constituency of Bury North covers the towns of Ramsbottom, Tottington and Bury. It was created in 1983 from parts of the former seats of Rossendale and Bury and Radcliffe. In those boundary changes Ramsbottom was transferred from Rossendale to Bury North, while with the loss of Ramsbottom, Rossendale was linked with Darwen. In 2010 the Unsworth area was transferred to Bury South.

Constituency profile
Despite its name, Bury North includes the entirety of the town of Bury.
A traditional Labour-Conservative marginal, Ramsbottom and Tottington are mostly Conservative, but in the case of Ramsbottom, not always overwhelmingly so, whereas the town of Bury itself (particularly the Bury East ward) is generally more favourable to Labour, with Elton being a marginal. Tottington, Church ward and the rural North Manor ward are safely Conservative, however Ramsbottom is now a Labour marginal, re-gained by the party in 2018. The 2011 Ramsbottom local election was famously a tie between the Labour and Conservative candidates, decided by drawing straws which Labour won and took control of the council.

The wards surrounding the town centre include some terraced and social housing and is ethnically diverse. The Bury town centre itself features two large sixth form colleges, the 'World Famous' market famed for Black Pudding as well as newer shopping and leisure developments such as The Rock. Tourist attractions include the East Lancashire Heritage Railway and Fusiliers Museum. North of Bury the area becomes more rural, approaching the provincial towns of Tottington and Ramsbottom, which are becoming increasingly desirable for Manchester commuters looking for quieter housing overlooking the West Pennines. 
Ramsbottom features Peel Monument, a tower on Holcombe Hill dedicated to former Conservative Prime Minister Robert Peel who was born in Bury. The tower is occasionally opened by volunteers, which offers views across Greater Manchester and as far out as Cheshire.

The constituency voted Leave in the 2016 referendum with a margin close to that of the national average at an estimated 54%.

Members of Parliament

Elections

Elections in the 2010s

This was the smallest Conservative majority at the 2019 general election.

Elections in the 2000s

Elections in the 1990s

Elections in the 1980s

See also 
 List of parliamentary constituencies in Greater Manchester

References

External links 
nomis Constituency Profile for Bury North — presenting data from the ONS annual population survey and other official statistics.

Parliamentary constituencies in Greater Manchester
Constituencies of the Parliament of the United Kingdom established in 1983
Politics of the Metropolitan Borough of Bury